Atlantis is an album by American jazz musician Sun Ra and his Astro-Infinity Arkestra, released in 1969 by El Saturn Records.

The album heavily features the "Solar Sound Instrument", a Hohner Clavinet. One of the four compositions which originally featured on Side 1 of the original release was substituted by a different piece for the 1973 reissue, though reusing the same name, "Yucatan". Both pieces appear on the later CD reissue.

The title track covered the second side of the LP and is regarded as a key prototype for Sun Ra's performances through the 1970s. It was recorded at a 1967 concert at the Olatunji Center of African Culture in New York  and has been described as "a masterpiece that twists and turns through many soundscapes".

Recording sessions
Side one was likely recorded at Sun Studios, New York (the Arkestra's commune) between 1967 and 1969; The title track on side two, Atlantis was recorded at the Olatunji Cultural Center on 125th Street, NY, in 1967. A different piece, similarly titled Yucatan was also recorded at the same period and later included for the Impulse reissue in 1973. Both versions of Yucatan were included when a record label, Evidence reissued Atlantis in the 1990s. This arrangement remained when Sun Ra's entire back catalog was remastered and reissued by Ra's estate (under the supervision of Irwin Chusid) in 2014.

Track listing
All tracks written by Sun Ra.

Side A:
"Mu" – 4:30
"Lemuria" – 5:02
"Yucatan" (either Saturn version, 5:27 or Impulse! version, 3:38)
"Bimini" – 5:45
Side B:
"Atlantis" – 21:51

Personnel

Sun Ra – Solar Sound Organ, Solar Sound Instrument (Clavinet)
John Gilmore- Tenor Saxophone, Percussion
Pat Patrick- Baritone Saxophone, Flute
Marshall Allen- Alto Saxophone, Oboe
Danny Ray Thompson – Alto Saxophone, Flute
Bob Barry – Drums, Lightning Drum
Wayne Harris – Trumpet
Ebah – Trumpet
Carl Nimrod – Space Drums
James Jacson – Log Drums
Robert Cummins – Bass Clarinet
Danny Davis – Alto Saxophone
Ali Harsan – Trombone
Alton Abraham – Producer (for Ihnfinity inc.)

References

Sun Ra albums
1969 albums
Evidence Music albums
Impulse! Records albums
El Saturn Records albums
Atlantis
Lemuria (continent)